Mask of the Andes, also known as The Liberators in the US, is a 1971 novel written by Australian author Jon Cleary set in Bolivia.

Cleary says he had been thinking about its themes for over ten years. The result was one of his most critically acclaimed works, with some critics drawing comparison to Graham Greene. The book did not sell well in Britain, the US or Australia, but was a big seller in Germany and South America. Cleary even received a fan letter from some of Che Guevara's former guerrillas.

References

External links
Mask of the Andes at AustLit (subscription required)

1971 Australian novels
Novels set in Bolivia
William Collins, Sons books
William Morrow and Company books
Novels by Jon Cleary